Female genital mutilation (FGM), also known as Female Genital Cutting (FGC) in Nigeria accounts for the most female genital cutting/mutilation (FGM/C) cases worldwide. The practice is customarily a family tradition that the young female of the age 0-15 would experience. It is a procedure that involves partial or completely removing the external females genitalia or other injury to the female genital organs whenever for non-medical reasons.

The practice is considered harmful to girls and women and a violation of human rights. FGM causes infertility, maternal death, infections, and the loss of sexual pleasure.

Nationally, 27% of Nigerian women between the ages of 15 and 49 were victims of FGM, as of 2012. In the last 30 years, prevalence of the practice has decreased by half in some parts of Nigeria. Female genital mutilation is on the rise among Nigerian girls aged 0-14 and Nigeria accounts for the third highest number of women and girls who have undergone FGM worldwide  UNICEF.

In May 2015, then President Goodluck Ebele Jonathan signed a federal law banning FGM. Opponents of the practice cite this move as an important step forward in Africa, as Nigeria is the most populous country and has set an important precedent. Though the practice has declined, activists and scholars say a cultural shift is necessary to abolish the practice, as the new law will not singularly change the wider violence against women in Nigeria.

Cultural perception 
The practice is mostly carried out by traditional circumcisers, without proper knowledge of human anatomy and medicine.

Despite the graveness of the issue, the practicing societies look on it as an integral part of their tradition and cultural identity. In the communities that follow excision of female genitalia, FGM/C is associated with ethnicity, culture, prevailing social norms, and sometimes as religious obligations. In majority of the cases it has been documented that their own family members such as parents mainly mothers, grandparents, and grandmothers of the girls are the perpetrators of this act. Ensuring daughter's virginity is a required task for them to arrange for her marriage, receive proper bride price, and for family honor. There is also a misconception belief that is still present in Nigeria that women believe that female circumcision increases sexual pleasure among men. Another belief is that FGM/C increases women's fertility, ability to procreate, and child's survival. Due to immense social pressure and fear of exclusion from the community, families conform to the tradition. In Nigeria and other societies, girls who have not gone through FGM/C are considered as unmarriageable, unclean and it is a social taboo. Girls who remain uncut may be teased or looked down upon in the society. Most times, the girls themselves desire to conform to peer as well as societal pressure out of the fear of stigmatization and rejection by their own community. They accept the practice as a necessary and normal part of life. In many communities this particular practice is upheld as a religious requirement. FGM/C is performed by Muslims, Christians, and Jews. However, it is carried out in some Muslim communities with the belief that it is demanded by Islamic faith.

In reality, though, there is no documentation of this practice in the holy texts of these religions. Moreover, the historical origin of the practice asserts that it predates the advent of all major religions of the world including Islam. Often older women become the moral gatekeepers in favor of this ritual to justify their own experience of genital cutting and they tend to see any effort to eliminate the practice as a threat to their culture.

Achieving gender equality and empowering all women and girls is the fifth Sustainable Development Goal (SDG) but In Nigeria it faces many problems due to many different resolutions not being in line with the religious and cultural beliefs of most of the Nigerian population and thus, unworthy to be enacted as a Nigerian law.

Data shows that the majority of people believe female genital cutting should end, but they cite social pressures to continue the practice with their daughters. Of women aged 15 to 49 polled between 2004–2015, 64% want to end the practice.

Influence on other African nations 
Human rights activists believe the 2015 federal ban in Nigeria will influence other African countries—a region in which the practice is highly prevalent—because of Nigeria's economic and political strength within the continent.

Types practiced 
Nigerians practice the following forms of female genital cutting/mutilation:
 Type I, clitoridectomy: Removing the clitoral hood and at least part of the clitoris
 Type II, sunna: Removing the full clitoris and part of the labia minora
 Type III, infibulation: Removing the clitoris, labia minora, and labia majora. This also involves stitching the vaginal opening with a minuscule hole for urination and menstrual bleeding.
 Type IV: Other unclassified forms of FGM may involve pricking, stretching, cauterization, or inserting herbs into the vagina.

Clitoridectomies are more common in the south of the country, and the more extreme methods, like infibulation, are prevalent in the north.

Activism 
Organizations seeking to end FGC/M in Nigeria include the World Health Organization, UNICEF, the International Federation of Gynaecology and Obstetrics, African Union, Devatop Centre for Africa Development, the Economic Commission for Africa, the Coalition of Advocates against Violence  and the Population Council. as well as Justice, Development and Peace Movement (JDPM) of the Catholic diocese of Oyo.

The Circumcision Descendants Association of Nigeria (CDAN)—a group whose members perform FGM in Nigeria, has advocated to end the practice by creating new government programs and economic opportunities for those who perform female genital mutilation.

In 2018, an event organized by UN Women, the United Nations Population Fund (UNFPA) and the Nigerian Mission to the UN, with other partners to help promote change of perceptions for the women in Africa.  Highlighting themes such as human trafficking, suicide bombing, female genital mutilation/cutting and sexism and sexual harassment at the United Nations, Ms. Itua, one of the presenters of the UN showcase the importance of women taking an active role in their nations said "As an African woman, I believe that my goal is to work with other women in creating awareness. Together we are stronger. Working together to be stronger to change the narrative coming out of Africa."

See also 
 Women in Nigeria
 Gender inequality in Nigeria

References 

Nigeria
Nigerian culture
Women in Nigeria
Women's rights in Nigeria
Human rights abuses in Nigeria